The 3rd Congressional District of Quezon, also known as the Bondoc Peninsula, is one of the four congressional districts of the Philippines in the province of Quezon, formerly Tayabas. It has been represented in the House of Representatives of the Philippines since 1987. The district consists of municipalities in the Bondoc Peninsula, the southern part of Tayabas Isthmus and southwest coast of Ragay Gulf, namely Agdangan, Buenavista, Catanauan, General Luna, Macalelon, Mulanay, Padre Burgos, Pitogo, San Andres, San Francisco, San Narciso and Unisan. It is currently represented in the 19th Congress by Reynante Arrogancia of the Reporma in July 2022, and later joined the Nationalist People's Coalition.

Representation History

Election results

2022

2019

2016

See also
 Legislative districts of Quezon

References

Congressional districts of the Philippines
Politics of Quezon
1987 establishments in the Philippines
Congressional districts of Calabarzon
Constituencies established in 1987